The Fleischer Superman cartoons are a series of seventeen animated short films released in Technicolor by Paramount Pictures and based upon the comic book character Superman, making them his first animated appearance.

They were originally produced by Fleischer Studios, which completed the initial short and eight further cartoons in 1941 and 1942. Production was resumed in May 1942 by Famous Studios, a successor company to Fleischer, which produced eight more cartoons in 1942 and 1943. Superman was the final animated series initiated by Fleischer Studios, before Famous Studios officially took over production.

Although all entries are in the public domain, ancillary rights, such as merchandising contract rights, as well as the original 35mm master elements, are owned today by Warner Bros. Entertainment, which has also owned Superman's publisher, DC Comics, since 1969.

On May 16, 2023, Warner Bros. will release a remastered Blu-ray set containing the 17 episodes, recreated from scans of the original 35mm negatives.

History

Development and initial entries 
Only the first nine cartoons were produced by Fleischer Studios; nonetheless, all 17 episodes are collectively known as "the Fleischer Superman cartoons". In 1942, Fleischer Studios was dissolved and reorganized as Famous Studios, which produced the final eight shorts. These cartoons are seen as some of the finest quality (and certainly, the most lavishly budgeted) animated cartoons produced during The Golden Age of American animation. In 1994, the first entry in the series was voted #33 on a list of The 50 Greatest Cartoons of all time by members of the animation field.

By mid-1941, brothers Max and Dave Fleischer were running their own animation studio in Miami, Florida, and had recently finished their first animated feature film, Gulliver's Travels. The Fleischers were also well into production on their second, Mr. Bug Goes to Town. Not wanting to risk becoming overworked (which could compromise the quality of each project), the Fleischers were strongly (but quietly) opposed to the idea of committing themselves to another major project when they were approached by their studio's distributor and majority owner since May 1941, Paramount Pictures. Paramount was interested in financially exploiting the phenomenal popularity of the then-new Superman comic books, by producing a series of theatrical cartoons based upon the character. The Fleischers, looking for a way to reject the project without appearing uncooperative, agreed to do the series—but only at an (intentionally inflated) per-episode-budget number so exorbitantly high that Paramount would have to reject them, instead. They told Paramount that producing such a conceptually and technically complex series of cartoons would cost about $100,000 per short (or $ per short as of ); this was about four times the typical budget of a six-minute episode of the Fleischers' popular Popeye the Sailor cartoons of that period. To the Fleischers' shock, instead of withdrawing its request, Paramount entered into negotiations with them, and got the per-episode budget lowered to $50,000. Now the Fleischers were committed to a project they never wanted to do—with more financial and marketing support than they had ever received for the projects they had done thus far.

The first cartoon in the series, simply titled Superman (a.k.a. The Mad Scientist), was released on September 26, 1941, and was nominated for the 1941 Academy Award for Best Short Subject: Cartoons. It lost to Lend a Paw, a Pluto cartoon from Walt Disney Productions and RKO Pictures.

The voice of Superman for the series was initially provided by Bud Collyer, who also performed the lead character's voice during The Adventures of Superman radio series. Joan Alexander was the voice of Lois Lane, a role she also portrayed on radio alongside Collyer. Music for the series was composed by Sammy Timberg, the Fleischers' long-time musical collaborator.

Rotoscoping, the process of tracing animation drawings from live-action footage, was used minimally to lend realism to the character's bodily movements. Many of Superman's actions, however, could not be rotoscoped (such as flying, lifting very large objects, etc.). In these cases, the Fleischers' lead animators—many of whom lacked training in figure drawing—animated "roughly" and depended upon their assistants (usually inexperienced animators but established draftsmen) to keep Superman "on model" during his action sequences.

The Fleischer cartoons were also responsible for giving Superman perhaps his most singular superpower: flight. When the Fleischers started work on the series, in the comic books, Superman could only leap from place to place (hence the classic phrase, "able to leap tall buildings in a single bound"). After seeing the leaping fully animated, however, the Fleischers deemed it "silly looking", and asked permission from Action Comics (later DC Comics) to have him fly instead; the publisher agreed, and Superman was formally given the power of flight thereafter. Previously, he was only shown flying on the cover of Triumph #772, in "The Adventure of Superman" radio show and in the comics due to an artist and editorial error in Superman #10.

Transition from Fleischer to Famous 
By the end of 1941, the brothers were no longer able to cooperate with each other, and the studio's co-owner Dave Fleischer had left Florida for California, where he would eventually become the new head of Columbia Pictures' Screen Gems studio. After the Fleischers were removed from the company, Paramount renamed the organization Famous Studios, placing Seymour Kneitel (Max Fleischer's son-in-law), Isadore Sparber, Sam Buchwald, and Dan Gordon in charge of production. The sleek look of the series continued, but there was a noticeable change in the storylines of the later shorts of the series after Famous replaced Fleischer as producer. The first nine cartoons had more of a science fiction aspect to them, as they involved the Man of Steel fighting robots, giant dinosaurs, meteors from outer space, and other perils. 

The later eight cartoons in the series, which were all Famous Studios productions, dealt more with World War II propaganda stories, such as in Eleventh Hour, which finds Superman going to Japan to commit acts of sabotage in order to reduce the morale of the enemy; meanwhile, an angered Adolf Hitler had a cameo role at the end of Jungle Drums after Superman foiled another Nazi plot.

The first seven cartoons originated the classic opening line which was later adopted by the Superman radio series and in the live-action television series a decade later: "Faster than a speeding bullet! More powerful than a locomotive! Able to leap tall buildings in a single bound!" (the radio series also eventually used the cartoon series' theme music). For the final two Fleischer-produced cartoons and the first of the eight Famous Studios-produced cartoons, the opening was changed to "Faster than a speeding bullet! More powerful than a locomotive! Able to soar higher than any plane!". For the remaining Famous Studios-produced cartoons, the opening line was changed again to "Faster than a streak of lightning! More powerful than the pounding surf! Mightier than a roaring hurricane!" For international prints of Superman cartoons starting with "Showdown" the opening line is "Faster than a streak of lightning! More powerful than the pounding surf! Mightier than a roaring hurricane!" This series also featured a slight variation of the now-classic exclamation (also from the radio series): "Up in the sky, look! It's a bird! It's a plane! It's Superman!".

Later history 
Famous Studios ended the series after a total of seventeen shorts had been produced, replacing it with a series of shorts based upon Marge's Little Lulu. The high cost of the series kept it from continuing in the face of budgetary restrictions that were imposed after removing the Fleischers from the studio. The first cartoon had a budget of $50,000 (equivalent to $ in ), and the other sixteen each had a budget of $30,000 (equivalent to $ in ) for each of the eight other Fleischer cartoons and $485,414.68 for each of the eight Famous Studios cartoons, bringing the total cost of the series to $530,000 (equivalent to $ in ). In addition, Paramount cited waning interest in the Superman shorts among theater exhibitors as another justification for the series' cancellation.

The rights to all seventeen cartoons eventually reverted to National Comics, who licensed TV syndication rights to Flamingo Films (distributors of the TV series Adventures of Superman). All eventually fell into the public domain, due to National's failure to renew their copyrights; thus, they have been widely distributed on VHS, LaserDisc, and DVD. Nonetheless, Warner Bros., via DC Comics, now owns the original film elements to the cartoons.

Related works 
A 1944 Famous Studios Popeye the Sailor cartoon entitled She-Sick Sailors parodied the Superman cartoons a year after production of the cartoons had ceased. In this cartoon, Popeye's enemy Bluto, who was voiced by the announcer for the Superman radio series, Jackson Beck, dresses up as Superman to fool Olive Oyl, and he challenges Popeye to feats of super-strength that "only Superman" can do. The musical score for She-Sick Sailors includes echoes of Sammy Timberg's Fleischer/Famous Superman score.

The previous year, Merrie Melodies did a parody starring Bugs Bunny called Super-Rabbit.

In a rare move for a competing studio, Leon Schlesinger Productions, producers of Looney Tunes and Merrie Melodies (which were distributed by WB), featured Timberg's Superman theme in Snafuperman, a 1944 Private Snafu cartoon Schlesinger produced for the U.S. Army.

Paramount's involvement in the Superman franchise did not end with the sale of the cartoons. In 1995, after being sold to Viacom, Paramount's television syndication unit absorbed Viacom Enterprises, and as a result, Paramount now held the TV rights to the third and fourth Superman films, along with the Supergirl film (which up to that point had been held by Viacom). Full rights to Superman III and Supergirl are now with WB, but Paramount still has some partial rights to Superman IV (as part of the Cannon Films library), and TV distribution is now held (on Paramount's behalf) by Trifecta Entertainment & Media.

Influence and legacy 

In 1985, DC Comics named Fleischer Studios as one of the honorees in the company's 50th anniversary publication Fifty Who Made DC Great for its work on the Superman cartoons. The series strongly influenced the creation of the acclaimed animated television series Batman: The Animated Series, as well as the similar-looking Superman: The Animated Series. Comic book artist Alex Ross has also listed the shorts among the inspiration for his take on Superman's look.

This animated version of Superman was planned to be made as a cameo in the deleted scene "Acme's Funeral" from the 1988 film Who Framed Roger Rabbit. 

The robot robbery scene from The Mechanical Monsters short has been echoed by several later works. In 1980, Japanese animated film writer and director Hayao Miyazaki created an identical robbery with a similarly functioning robot in the last episode of the TV series Lupin the Third Part II, a robot design he used again in his feature film Castle in the Sky.

The elements of the scene were borrowed again in 1994 for "The Tick vs. Brainchild" (Season 1, Episode 9 of The Tick), with the robbery committed by Skippy, a cyborg dog.

The 2004 feature-length movie Sky Captain and the World of Tomorrow (which Paramount released in several territories, WB also distributed in a few countries) kept the setting in the 1940s, but scaled up the scene from a single robot robbing a jewelry exhibition to an army of gigantic robots stealing city infrastructure. The movie gave a nod to its source following the robbery with the newspaper headline, "Mechanical Monsters Unearth Generators".

The Mechanical Monsters itself was featured as part of Fantastic Animation Festival.

A 1988 music video for the song "Spy In The House of Love" by Chrysalis Records recording artists Was (Not Was) borrowed footage extensively from Famous' Secret Agent short.

Availability 
The Paramount Superman cartoons are widely available on VHS, DVD and online.

The first "official" home video releases of the series were by Warner Home Video in 1987 and 1988, in a series of VHS and LaserDisc packages called TV's Best Adventures of Superman. Four volumes were released, where each volume contained 2 selected episodes of the classic 1950s TV series Adventures of Superman (one black & white episode and one color episode), plus a selected Max Fleischer Superman short (marking the first "official" release of such as Warner holds the original film elements).

Among the best reviewed of these various releases was a 1991 VHS set produced by Bosko Video, the somewhat incorrectly titled The Complete Superman Collection: Golden Anniversary Edition - The Paramount Cartoon Classics of Max & Dave Fleischer released as two VHS volumes which featured high-quality transfers from 35mm prints. The Bosko Video set was later issued on DVD by Image Entertainment as The Complete Superman Collection: Diamond Anniversary Edition in 2000. The Bosko Video release was not associated with DC Comics or their parent company Warner Bros.

Another DVD was Superman: The Ultimate Max Fleischer Cartoon Collection from VCI Entertainment released on May 30, 2006, a month prior to the release of the film Superman Returns. DVD features included: all 17 animated shorts digitally restored in Dolby Digital 2.0 audio; a bonus cartoon: Snafuperman (a 1944 Warner Bros. wartime parody of the Fleischer cartoons, featuring Private Snafu and produced for the U.S. Army); "Behind the Cape" synopses and fun facts with each cartoon; a DVD fold-out booklet with notes on the series; bios of the voice actors, producer Max Fleischer, and Superman; a bonus trailer for the 1948 Superman serial with Kirk Alyn; and a recorded audio phone interview with Joan Alexander (the voice of Lois Lane). This release, like the Bosko Video release, was not associated with DC Comics or their parent company Warner Bros.

A more "official" release from restored and remastered, superior original vault elements was released on DVD on November 28, 2006, as part of Warner Home Video's Superman film re-releases. The first nine cartoons were released as part of the four-disc special edition Superman: The Movie set, and the eight remaining cartoons were included on the two-disc special edition Superman II set. The entire collected Fleischer / Famous cartoons were included in the box sets The Christopher Reeve Superman Collection and Superman Ultimate Collector's Edition, where both sets also included a 13-minute short documentary on the history of these cartoons, entitled First Flight: The Fleischer Superman Series. This documentary (which was included on the Superman II two-disc special edition DVD) features interviews with surviving members, relatives and biographers of the animation and production team, also contemporary animators such as Bruce Timm (Batman: The Animated Series), Paul Dini and Dan Riba (Superman: The Animated Series) who detail the influence these cartoons have had on their own works. Upon this release though, there was controversy by some consumers over why Warner's chose to release these animated shorts amongst the Superman films DVD releases instead of packaging them as their own complete individual DVD release.

In 2004, a two-disc set was released by Platinum disc corporation with digitally enhanced audio 5.1.

In December 2004, Toonami Digital Arsenal made the shorts available for free download in mp4 format on its website. They posted one episode per day with the final episode, "Secret Agent", going live on New Year's Day 2005.

Another came on July 1, 2008, when Warner Bros. released the shorts on iTunes, via their DC Comics sections. Fourteen of the shorts are available for $1.99 for every two, while the other three are all in one video for the same price.

On April 7, 2009, yet another release was made, this time a collection of all the cartoons released by Warner Home Video as the first authorized collection from the original masters, titled Max Fleischer's Superman: 1941-1942 with a suggested price at $26.99; the set included one new special feature in the form of "The Man, The Myth, Superman" featurette, along with an old special feature seen in the Superman II 2006 DVD release entitled "First Flight: The Fleischer Superman Series".

The 8-disc Blu-ray boxset The Superman Motion Picture Anthology, released in June 2011, includes all the Max Fleischer cartoons in SD as bonuses on the discs for the two versions of Superman II. The nine Fleischer Studios cartoons plus the 13-minutes feature First Flight: The Fleischer Superman Series are on the Superman II - Original 1980/81 Theatrical Release disc and the eight Famous Studios cartoons are on the Superman II - The 2006 Richard Donner Cut disc.

A Blu-ray set containing all the cartoons, called Max Fleischer's Superman: Collector's Edition was released on October 30, 2012 by the Gaiam studio. According to Blu-Ray.com and Amazon reviews, it was upscaled from standard definition to HD, and the set's video quality and audio quality were criticized.

The shorts were available for the first time in true HD on WarnerMedia's DC Universe streaming service. After the service went down in early 2021, they were no longer available. They have yet to reappear on WarnerMedia's flagship streaming service HBO Max.

An "official" Blu-ray set from Warner Home Video will be released on May 16, 2023. All of the cartoons will be restored in 4K resolution.

List of films 
As all of these cartoons are now in the public domain, free downloadable links from the Internet Archive have been provided.

Fleischer Studios

Famous Studios

See also 
 List of films in the public domain in the United States

References

External links 

 

1940s animated films
Animated short film series
Superman animated shorts
Rotoscoped films
Animated action films
Fleischer Studios series and characters
Famous Studios series and characters
Film series introduced in 1941
1943 disestablishments
1940s American films